964 Subamara (prov. designation:  or ), is a stony background asteroid from the outer regions of the asteroid belt, approximately  in diameter. It was discovered by Austrian astronomer Johann Palisa at the Vienna Observatory on 27 October 1921. The S-type asteroid has a rotation period of 6.9 hours. It was named for the observatory's "very bitter" observing conditions due to light pollution.

Orbit and classification 

Subamara is a non-family asteroid of the main belt's background population when applying the hierarchical clustering method to its proper orbital elements. It orbits the Sun in the outer asteroid belt at a distance of 2.7–3.4 AU once every 5 years and 4 months (1,944 days; semi-major axis of 3.05 AU). Its orbit has an eccentricity of 0.12 and an inclination of 9° with respect to the ecliptic.

Naming 

This minor planet was named for the Latin "very bitter" (combining sub and amara), most likely referring to the increasingly poor observing conditions due to light pollution at the Vienna Observatory in the early 1920s. In this article, Palisa complains about the bad weather and the light pollution caused by the continued operation of arc lamps at Ringstreet in Vienna's Währing district, where the observatory is located. Remembering a particular night in August 1923, Palisa was unable to visually find asteroid 995 Sternberga with his large 27-inch telescope. When he learnt that the same asteroid was easily spotted at Heidelberg Observatory despite using a telescope with a much smaller aperture of only 12-inch, he first thought of his declining eyesight before realizing, it was due in fact to the city's increasing light pollution, and that the time has come to relocated the Vienna Observatory elsewhere.

Physical characteristics 

In the SDSS-based taxonomy, Subamara is a common, stony S-type asteroid.

Rotation period 

Over four nights in January 2013, a rotational lightcurve of Subamara was obtained from photometric observations by Michael Alkema at the Elephant Head Observatory  in Arizona. Lightcurve analysis gave a well-defined rotation period of  hours with a brightness variation of  magnitude.

James Folberth and colleges of the Rose-Hulman Institute of Technology previously observed this asteroid at Oakley Southern Sky Observatory  in August 2011, finding a period of  hours with an amplitude of  magnitude. In November 2017, Tom Polakis at the Command Module Observatory  in Tempe, Arizona, determined  hours with an amplitude of  magnitude.

Diameter and albedo 

The Collaborative Asteroid Lightcurve Link assumes a standard albedo for a stony S-type asteroid of 0.20 and calculates a diameter of 20.56 kilometers based on an absolute magnitude of 10.8.

References

External links 
 Lightcurve Database Query (LCDB), at www.minorplanet.info
 Dictionary of Minor Planet Names, Google books
 Asteroids and comets rotation curves, CdR – Geneva Observatory, Raoul Behrend
 Discovery Circumstances: Numbered Minor Planets (1)-(5000) – Minor Planet Center
 
 

000964
Discoveries by Johann Palisa
Named minor planets
19211027